Rosa 'Cherish,  (aka JACsal), is an orange-pink floribunda rose cultivar. Bred by William Warriner in the United States before 1977 and introduced by Jackson & Perkins in 1980, the rose was named an All-America Rose Selections, also in 1980.  The stock parents are the floribunda roses, 'Bridal Pink' and 'Matador'.

Description
'Cherish' is a medium bushy shrub, 3 to 4 ft (90-120 cm) in height with a 2 to 3ft (60-90 cm) spread. Blooms are 2-3 in (5-7  cm) in diameter, with 16-25 petals. Flowers have a mild scent, and have a high-centered, double bloom form. The flowers are borne singly or in small clusters. Buds are reddish-orange The flowers open initially as a coral pink and then turn to a light pink with a salmon center.  The rose has a strong, spice fragrance. Leaves are large and dark green, and susceptible to blackspot. The plant thrives in USDA zone 6 and warmer and blooms in flushes from spring to fall.

Awards 
 All-America Rose Selections winner, USA, (1980)

See also
Garden roses
Rose Hall of Fame
List of Award of Garden Merit roses

Notes

References

Cherish